The Gloriavale Christian Community (also known as the Cooperites) is a small and isolated community located at Haupiri on the West Coast of the South Island in New Zealand. It has an estimated population of over 600. It has operated on a property owned by a registered charity since 2008.

History 
The group was founded in 1969 by Neville Cooper (aka "Hopeful Christian"), an Australian-born preacher who was invited to New Zealand, having earlier (as a member of the Voice of Deliverance Evangelist Mission) survived a near fatal 1965 plane crash in south-east Queensland.

Cooper founded what became known as the Springbank Christian Community near Christchurch, moving to a larger property on the West Coast of New Zealand between 1991 and 1995 when the community grew too large for its existing home.

Public apology
On 27 May 2022, Gloriavale's leadership issued a public apology for various sexual and child abuses and labour exploitations that occurred within their community.  The leadership claimed that much had changed at Gloriavale following the resignation of their previous leader and founder in 2018. The leadership agreed to allow young people to make decisions on whether to continue living at Gloriavale or moving out once they had matured. To address future sexual offending, the leadership established a "Child Protection Leads team" that answered directly to Oranga Tamariki (the Ministry of Children).  The leadership also claimed to have developed a new child protection policy which encouraged members to report acts of abuse to the Police, Child Protection Leads team, and Oranga Tamariki. They also claimed to have restructured their business operations to allow parents to spend more time with their children after 3pm.

On 31 May, two senior Gloriavale leaders Fervent Steadfast and Faithful Pilgrim resigned from their positions as senior community leaders following the public apology. Steadfast had previously served as Gloriavale's financial controller and had been accused of mishandling employment issues within the community. Pilgrim had previously served as the Principal of Gloriavale Christian School until his resignation in 2020 for failing to protect pupils in his care.

Overview 
Known by some outsiders as the "Cooperites" after their leader Neville Cooper, the group rejects this name and members refer to themselves only as Christians. Members of the community live a fundamentalist Christian life in accordance with their interpretation of the teachings of the New Testament. The community attempts to uphold the example of the first Christian church in Jerusalem (Acts 2:41–47) for its principles of sharing and holding all things in common.

The group teaches that the only true way to salvation is through faith in Jesus Christ and obedience to the commands of God. The group's beliefs are set out in What We Believe, the doctrinal book written by the group, covering the way its members should live, what they should believe, and how they should behave. The book is not taken to replace the authority of the Bible within the group, instead outlining its doctrines with supporting Bible verses.

The community earns its income from several ventures including dairying, deer and sheep farms. The community also earns income from the manufacture of gardening products made from sphagnum moss, as well as formerly running scenic and charter flights from Greymouth through their company Air West Coast.

The community runs Gloriavale Christian School, a private coeducational composite (years 1–13) school with a roll of 200. The school moved to the West Coast in 1990.

Demographics 
Statistics New Zealand designates Gloriavale as a rural settlement, covering  around the community.

The Gloriavale settlement had a usual resident population of 609 people at the 2018 New Zealand census, an increase of 114 people (23.0%) since the 2013 census, and an increase of 249 people (69.2%) since the 2006 census. There were 285 males and 324 females, giving a sex ratio of 0.88 males per female. Of the total population, 366 people (60.1%) were aged up to 15 years, 120 (19.7%) were 15 to 29, 108 (17.7%) were 30 to 64, and 18 (3.0%) were 65 or older.

In terms of ethnicity, 100.0% of the population identified as European (Pākehā), 3.4% as Māori, and 0.5% as Pacific peoples (totals add to more than 100% since people could identify with multiple ethnicities).

Media coverage
In 2016, a three-part documentary on TVNZ 2 extensively covered the community, with the documentary team being given unprecedented access to the community. The series is available online within New Zealand. An additional set of 8 mini-episodes, titled Gloriavale: The Return was released in 2018. Television channels made additional films about the community in 2017 and 2018. In 2022, the documentary film Gloriavale was released, profiling the community and the Ready family court case.

Controversies

Cult allegations
Those who leave the community are sometimes shunned and denied contact with family members who have not left Gloriavale; because most residents in Gloriavale are born into the community, this can often comprise a person's entire family. The Apologetics Index, a Christian cult-watching organisation, refers to Gloriavale as a "cult, both theologically and sociologically", stating that "theologically, this group is a cult of Christianity, as its theology – as well as its practices based on that theology – places it well outside the boundaries of the Christian faith." A wide-ranging government investigation into the community began in 2015, leading to a number of charges. A police investigation is still ongoing, with no charges yet brought against Gloriavale or members of its community.

In 2017, Lilia Tarawa, the granddaughter of Gloriavale's founder, spoke at a TEDx Christchurch conference on her experiences growing up as a member of the community. The talk was inspired by her autobiographical book Daughter of Gloriavale, released the same year. Tarawa described abusive practices as part of daily life for members of Gloriavale, including beatings, forced marriages, and psychological control, leading some of Gloriavale's members – including some of Tarawa's siblings – to run away from the community. The video of Tarawa's talk became widely popular online following its upload to YouTube. , the video has over 12,218,564 views.

Stories of child abuse, rape, and other forms of cruelty and subjugation have also emerged from other former members. News of controversial practices in the community led to the police making daily checks on the community in 2018.

COVID-19 pandemic
On 29 March 2020, it was reported that members of the Gloriavale community were failing to comply with lockdown procedures amidst the ongoing COVID-19 pandemic in New Zealand, with reports that childcare at community-run daycare centres, lessons at community-run schools, and meetings were all continuing despite social distancing measures. Police forces within the area later confirmed that they were working with Gloriavale in order to ensure that members of its community abided by lockdown restrictions.

Abuse allegations
In 1995, Neville Cooper was jailed for almost a year on sexual abuse charges. He was convicted based on the testimonies of his son and a young woman who had fled the compound. Cooper later changed his name to Hopeful Christian. Cooper died of cancer on 15 May 2018, aged 92.

In July 2020, the New Zealand Police in conjunction with Oranga Tamariki launched Operation Minneapolis, an investigation into child abuse at Gloriavale, after receiving information about alleged abuse of an 11-year-old boy. In September 2020, a 20-year-old man was charged with doing an indecent act on three boys between the ages of 12 and 16 years. He was discharged in September 2021 without conviction after pleading guilty – the offences had occurred when he himself was a teenager and the court felt there was a low risk of him reoffending.

On 12 February 2021, the police laid charges of child abuse against two other members; an adult and a child.

On 22 March 2021, 1 News reported that two Christchurch-based lawyers Nicholas Davidson KC and Stephanie Grieve had been asked by the trustees of Gloriavale's governing Christian Church Community Trust to hold an independent inquiry of allegations of sexual abuse at Gloriavale.

On 4 August 2021, a former Gloriavale man pleaded guilty in the Greymouth District Court to eight charges of indecently assaulting girls, two charges of indecently assaulting a boy, and one count of sexual violation.

On 11 August 2021, the New Zealand Police, Oranga Tamariki and the Teaching Council confirmed that they were investigating allegations of physical and sexual abuse of students at Gloriavale's school, which has 204 students ranging from Year 1 to Year 11. Several staff had also been stood down for unspecified reasons. Police claimed that at least 60 people in Gloriavale had been involved in "harmful sexual behaviour".

On 26 May 2022, the New Zealand Teachers' Disciplinary Tribunal suspended the teaching license of former Gloriavale Christian School principal Faithful Pilgrim for three years. Pilgrim had endorsed the teaching license of a teacher named Just Standfast, who had sexually abused a child on two occasions in 2012 and 2016. The Tribunal had investigated Pilgrim after receiving a complaint from the Gloriavale Leaders' Trust that he had endangered children by covering up the teacher's offending. Standfast had pleaded guilty to a charge of sexual contact with a child in 2019.

In mid September 2022, Gloriavale Christian School principal Rachel Stedfast claimed that a small group of people had made a coordinated campaign to close down the school by filing complaints against most of its teachers. As a result of the complaints, the affected teachers had been suspended from their teaching duties while the complaints were being investigated. Stedfast stated that none of the suspended teachers had been accused of physical sexual abuse.

In early November 2022, Gloriavale member and dairy worker Tim Disciple had his prison sentence for indecent assault reduced. Disciple had been sentenced in June 2022 to two years and five months in jail after being convicted of seven charges of indecent assault against five victims including minors between 2000 and 2006. Disciple successfully appealed against his sentence to the High Court where Judge Jonathan Eaton reduced his sentence to 21 months. In addition, Disciple's name suppression was lifted, allowing the media to cover his case.

On 7 March 2023, the Timaru Herald reported that a former Gloriavale farm manager John Ready had pleaded guilty at the Timaru District Council to assaulting two 11-year old boys with a metal fence standard for disobeying him while performing farming chores at Gloriavale. Judge Jim Large remanded Ready on bail for sentencing on 13 June 2023 and also ordered that restorative justice options be explored with one of his former victims, who had since left Gloriavale.

Lawsuits
In February 2021, a former Gloriavale member named John Ready filed a civil claim at the Christchurch High Court seeking to remove the board of trustees of the Christian Church Community Trust, the registered charity behind Gloriavale, and replace them with a public trust. Defendants named in the lawsuit included Fervent Steadfast, Faithful Pilgrim and Gloriavale leader Howard Temple.

In mid-May 2021, Stuff and The New Zealand Herald obtained court documents relating to Ready's lawsuit against the Gloriavale. Ready and his fellow plaintiffs have alleged that the community bred "sexual predators", exploited members as forced labour, and required members to give up all their possessions, including property, money, and any future earnings to the Christian Church Community Trust. Gloriavale's leadership has denied these allegations, contesting that they are untrue or historical.
 
The legal action concluded 10 June 2021, with the Christian Community Charitable Trust agreeing to be overseen by the Public Trust for a period of 18 months. During this time the Public Trust will provide regular reports to the High Court of New Zealand.

Workplace exploitation

Official investigations
In late September 2020, WorkSafe New Zealand dispatched inspectors to Gloriavale to investigate claims that some members had been forced to work for more than 20 hours a day. The news company Newshub also reported that current Gloriavale members had been targeted by the sect's leadership for speaking to the media. As a result of the Newshub investigation, Justice Minister Andrew Little had ordered the police, WorkSafe and the Labour Inspectorate to launch a second investigation into allegations of "controlling behaviour" and labour exploitation at Gloriavale.

On 1 October, Little, in his capacity as Minister of Workplace Relations, ordered a major review into practices at Gloriavale after Newshub obtained a government report from July 2017 reporting "oppressive psychological practices", possible exploitation, bullying, manipulation and coercion within the community. On 2 October, WorkSafe instructed Gloriavale's leadership to improve their work practices but found no evidence to suggest that the religious community was not managing the risk of workplace fatigue. WorkSafe had conducted a workplace assessment during which a team of four inspectors assessed Gloriavale, four subsidiary companies, and 13 workers.

On 10 August 2021, 1 News reported that several former Gloriavale members had alleged that they had been forced to sign a document waiving their right to legal advice when joining the community. The Labour Inspectorate also investigated a so-called partnership agreement as part of its inquiry into long working conditions.

May 2022 Employment Court ruling
On 21 February 2022, three former Gloriavale residents – Hosea Courage, Daniel Pilgrim and Levi Courage – challenged two earlier Labour Inspectorate inquiries in both 2017 and 2020, which found that they were volunteers and thus not entitled to pay or employment rights. Consequently, the Labour Inspectorate had declined to investigate the labour conditions, including alleged long working hours, at Gloriavale. The plaintiffs want the Employment Court to determine their employment status while they lived at Gloriavale and to determine whether they were exploited as workers. Courage alleged that Gloriavale residents were forced to work and beaten and starved as punishment for refusing to work or not working fast enough. Courage also alleged that he was beaten by his parents and authority figures.

On 10 May 2022, the Employment Court ruled in favour of Courage, Pilgrim and Courage's legal challenge, accepting that they had been employees at Gloriavale since the age of six. The Court found that the trio had been forced to perform "strenuous, difficult and sometimes dangerous" work when they were legally required to attend school. This landmark decision has the potential to encourage other former Gloriavale residents to pursue legal action against the religious community. In response to the Employment Court ruling, WorkSafe New Zealand confirmed that it would send inspectors to investigate conditions at Gloriavale. In addition, the Charities Commission commenced an investigation into Gloriavale's trust over allegations of unpaid child labour, beatings, and the withholding of food. If these allegations are proven, Gloriavale would lose its charitable status, costing it its donee status and tax benefits.

Following the Employment Court's ruling in May 2022, Silver Fern Farms announced on 24 May that it would no longer be supplying offal to Gloriavale's trading company Value Proteins. In addition, Westland Dairy suspended milk collection from Gloriavale–operated farms. In addition, meat processing company Alliance Group confirmed that it was reconsidering its relationship with Gloriavale in light of reports of labour exploitation. That same month, WorkSafe inspectors traveled to Gloriavale and issued nine improvement notices relating to the management of hazardous substances, machines and traffic at the community's grounds in Haupiri. By 15 August 2022, Gloriavale had complied with six of the nine notices, with the remaining three due to be completed by November 2022. In addition, WorkSafe had issued a total of 19 improvement notices to four Gloriavale businesses since September 2020.

Westland milk collection dispute
In June 2022, the Chinese-owned dairy company Westland Milk announced that it would cease collecting milk from three dairy farms owned by Gloriavale. In response, Gloriavale's subsidiary Canaan Farming Dairy sought a High Court injunction, prompting Westland to agree to continue collecting Canaan's milk until the Employment Court made a ruling on a second labour exploitation case filed by several former Gloriavale women.

On 4 October, High Court Justice Jan-Marie Doogue ordered Westland Milk to continue collecting milk from Canaan Farming Dairy's three farms Bell Hill, Gloriavale and Glen Hopeful on the condition that it did not hire any minors or associate employees under the age of 18 years. In her ruling, Doogue ruled there was no evidence that Canaan had breached its obligations as an employer and that the company was not a party to the Employment Court case which had sparked the contract move suspension. She also rejected Westland's claim that it had lost customers as a result of its business relationship with Canaan Farming. Gloriavale Christian Community including Canaan Farming Dairy director Samuel Valor welcomed the High Court's ruling and emphasised the community's willingness to comply with employment requirements.

Second Employment Court case
In August 2022, Radio New Zealand reported that six former Glorivale women named Serenity Pilgrim, Anna Courage, Rose Standtrue, Crystal Loyal, Pearl Valour and Virginia Courage had filed a second case with the Employment Court to determine whether they were employees or volunteers at Gloriavale. The case was set to begin on 29 August and expected to last three weeks. The Employment Court heard from 49 witnesses, who testified about various abuses including an alleged institutional culture of misogyny and victim blaming, sexual harassment of female members, and being forced to work for long hours with no breaks and little food. 

Two witnesses Naomi Pilgrim and Pearl Valor testified about being denied medical treatment for various health issues including dental problems, damaged fingers, and sustaining back injuries from difficult and long working conditions. In early September, Virgnia Courage and Rosanna Overcomer testified about community leaders shaming and sexually harassing female members of the community. On 19 September, one former Gloriavale leader Zion Pilgrim testified that the leadership had threatened to strip him of his leadership positions for raising concerns about sexual offending. 

The following day, Pilgrim testified that Glorivale had received millions in child welfare benefits from the New Zealand Government despite requiring children between the age of 6 and 18 years old to work long, punishing hours. On 21 September, Crystal testified that she had only been given one week of maternity leave after giving birth to her eldest child. She also testified that young mothers were expected to work long hours and were given little time to spend with their children. Trudy Christian testified about children being subject to frequent corporal punishment while former member John Ready testified about his epileptic daughter suffering third degree burns after experiencing a seizure while working in the kitchen.

On 23 September, the defence opened its case. Gloriavale Christian School principal Rachel Stedfast disputed claims that the community's women were forced to work and mistreated by the elders, likening life there to a Māori marae. She testified that Gloriavale was a harmonious community where members happily worked and gave their wages to the community. On 27 September, defence witness Purity Valor testified that Gloriavale's leaders were unaware about sexual abuse within their community. She also claimed that media coverage of Gloriavale had resulted in the community being "slandered" and members receiving public abuse. On 28 September, the Employment Court heard testimony from Sarah Standtrue that Gloriavale's leadership had burnt a book that her husband had written but that he had been readmitted to the community after apologising. Standtrue claimed that members of Gloriavale were free to leave. Standtrue's daughter Compassion testified that Gloriavale disputed allegations of members being overworked, abuse, and denied food and care.

On 29 September, Joanna Courage testified in defence of her grandfather Howard Temple, Gloriavale's Overseeing Shepherd. She disputed claims that Temple had abused or behaved inappropriately towards female members of the community. Courage also disputed the plaintiffs' allegations that they had been overworked. On 30 September, chartered accountant Gordon Hansen testified that Gloriavale had received NZ$4.8 million in government funds in the 2021 financial year including NZ$2.3 million in Working for Families payments, NZ$2 million in early childcare education grants, NZ$283,000 in Ministry of Education grants and NZ$229,000 for midwifery services. Gloriavale's barrister Philip Skelton KC testified that the majority of Gloriavale's income came from its farming businesses, which generated NZ$19.5 million that year. The Employment Court case was adjourned until 2023.

In December 2022, Gloriavale confirmed that it would no longer hire the services of defence lawyer  Philip Skelton KC since it was unable to sustain the costs of a legal team. The community Shepherds Samuel Valor, Howard Temple, Stephen Steadfast, Noah Hopeful and Faithful Pilgrim would instead conduct their own defence with the assistance of Peter Righteous. On 18 January 2023, Chief Employment Court Judge Jude Inglis confirmed that she would visit Gloriavale in February 2023 to better understand the evidence presented in Court. The trial will restart in Christchurch on 13 February before shifting to Greymouth between 20 and 24 February.  

On 13 February 2023, Gloriavale resident and mother Priscilla Stedfast gave testimony disputing earlier testimony by the six leavers Standtrue, Valor, Pilgrim, Courage, Loyal and Courage about harsh and abusive working conditions on Gloriavale. Stedfast stated that she was never an employee and never intended to be one. She testified that people were free to leave Gloriavale without being ostracised as the leavers suggested. Stedfast also testified that Gloriavale supporters leavers by providing funds, transportation, and denied that they restricted contact between members and leavers. On 17 February, the Employment Court heard testimony detailing the sexual offending of the late Gloriavale founder Hopeful Christian. On 20 February, Gloriavale resident Temperance Hopeful argued in her testimony that introducing employment laws and wages would destroy Gloriavale's way of life. She alleged that the employment case was an attack on the commune's faith and disputed the plaintiffs' allegations of slave labour, describing it as a "labour of love to those who love to serve Christ by serving one another."

On 24 February, Chief Judge Christina Inglis along with lawyers, court staff, leavers Virginia and Anna Courage and Pearl Valor, and members of the media toured Gloriavale's Haupiri site to gain a better understanding of the reclusive community and the evidence being presented at Court. The tour was guided by Purity Valor and her husband Samuel Valor, a Shepherd in the community. On 27 February, Overseeing Shepherd Howard Temple admitted that Gloriavale's leaders had made mistakes and promised to report future abuses to the Police, rather than appealing for repentance and forgiveness. During cross-examination on 28 February, Temple rejected assertions by the leavers that Glorivale's leadership imposed their religious faith on the community's children through isolation and ignorance, contending that the community sought to protect their children from "sinful" world influences.

On 1 March, Temple confirmed during testimony at the Employment Court that Police were investigating allegations of forced labour, slavery and servitude at Gloriavale. On 20 March, the Employment Court heard testimony from the plaintiffs' lawyers that the Crown had known about Gloriavale founder Hopeful Christian's sexual abuse crimes since the mid-1990s but had failed to help the community deal with his crimes.

Gloriavale Leavers' Support Trust
The Gloriavale Leavers' Support Trust was founded in 2019 to provide practical support to people leaving the community. They also advocate for the needs and rights of the people who have left the community, as well as those who remain within it. In mid–June 2021, the Trust launched an Emergency Welfare Appeal campaign including a video to help former Gloriavale residents reintegrate into the outside world.

See also
Lilia Tarawa, former member of Gloriavale, author, speaker, entrepreneur

References

Further reading

External links

 Gloriavale Christian Community
 "Father tells of rescuing kids from West Coast cult" – NZ Herald
 "Dad reaches out to sect child" – NZ Herald
 Gloriavale Leavers Support Trust

Christian communities
Christian new religious movements
Christian denominations in New Zealand
Fundamentalist denominations
Christian organizations established in 1969
1969 establishments in New Zealand
King James Only movement
Cults